The 2022 Big West Conference women's soccer tournament was the postseason women's soccer tournament for the Big West Conference held from October 30 to November 6, 2022. The Semifinals and Final of the five-match tournament took place at Mustang Memorial Field in San Luis Obispo, California and the higher seed hosted First Round games. The six-team single-elimination tournament consisted of three rounds based on seeding from regular season conference play. This was the first season that the tournament expanded to six teams, as it had only previously invited the top four teams.  The defending champions were the UC Irvine Anteaters. The Anteaters successfully defended their title, defeating Long Beach State 3–0 in the Final.  This was the third Big West tournament title for the UC Irvine program and the second for head coach Scott Juniper. As tournament champions, UC Irvine earned the Big West's automatic berth into the 2022 NCAA Division I women's soccer tournament.

Seeding 
The top six teams in the regular season earned a spot in the tournament and teams were seeded by regular season conference record. A tiebreaker was required to determine the second and third seed and who would get a First Round bye.  UC Davis and Cal State Fullerton both finished with identical 6–2–2 regular season records.  UC Davis earned the second seed and First Round bye by virtue of their 2–1 home victory over Cal State Fullerton on October 20th.

Bracket

Source:

Schedule

Quarterfinals

Semifinals

Final

Statistics

Goalscorers

References 

Big West Conference Women's Soccer Tournament
2022 Big West Conference women's soccer season